Maggie is a British television series produced by the BBC between 1981 and 1982. It was based on a quartet of books written by Joan Lingard during the 1970s – The Clearance, The Resettling, The Pilgrimage and The Reunion.

Set in the city of Glasgow, the series centred on teenager Maggie McKinley (played by Kirsty Miller) and the problems of adolescence as she aspired to further education, a career and an independent life whilst her parents (Michael Sheard and Mary Riggans) expected her to take a secure job, get married and "settle down". Much of the action also centred on Maggie staying with her feisty octogenarian grandmother (Jean Faulds) in Inverness-shire: the latter frequently acted as an important confidante to her granddaughter. The two series followed Maggie's progress, ending as she faces a crossroads in her life – whether to go to university or work for the family business. The theme music was by pop star B. A. Robertson.

External links
 

1981 British television series debuts
1982 British television series endings
BBC children's television shows
Television shows set in Glasgow
1980s British children's television series
Television series about teenagers